The Ouham River is a river in Central Africa, and one of the main headwaters of the Chari River. The Ouham originates in the Central African Republic between the prefecture Nana-Mambéré and the prefecture Ouham-Pendé, crossing into Chad where it joins the Chari about 25 km north Sarh. Tributaries are Baba, Fafa, Nana Bakassa, Nana Barya.

Hydrometry
The flow of the river observed over 33 years (1951–84) in Moïssala a town in Chad about 150 km above the mouth of the Chari. The at Moïssala observed average annual flow during this period was 480 m³ / s fed by an area of about 67,600 km  approximately 95% of the total catchment area of the River.

 
The average monthly flow of the river Sara at hydrological station of Moïssala (in m³ / s )
(Calculated using the data for a period of 33 years, 1951–84)

See also 
 Lake Chad replenishment project
 Waterway

References

Rivers of the Central African Republic
Rivers of Chad
Chari River
International rivers of Africa